Rami Eid, known professionally as offrami, is a music producer from Lebanon, residing in Los Angeles. Offrami began his career by going under the artist name "RAMI", accumulating over eight hundred thousand monthly listeners on Spotify. In 2019, he decided to change his official artist name from RAMI to offrami forcing him to change his artist account on all streaming platforms. He currently has over nine hundred thousand monthly listeners on Spotify under his new artist name offrami.

Career

Early life
Offrami was born on March 12, 1994, in Abu Dhabi, United Arab Emirates but is of Lebanese descent. He spent the majority of his youth in Beirut before moving to Florida to pursue his passion of making music. He began attending Full Sail University, one of the top ranked colleges for music production in the US, and majored in Recording Arts. Right after graduating, offrami took up an internship at a recording studio in Glenwood, California called Glenwood Place Studios where he was able to get a first-hand view of well-known artists and their producers work. The artists included but are not limited to names such as Lil Wayne, Bruno Mars, Burna Boy, and Pharrell Williams. This fueled his passion for music and set him on the path of turning his hobby of music production into a full-time career.

2016
Offrami started off his career as a remix-artist in an attempt to prove himself and build an audience before launching any originals. His rise to fame began with his remix of Arizona's song 'I Was Wrong' reaching No. 1 on Hype Machine and racking over seven million plays on SoundCloud. His first remix's success allowed him to receive additional remix requests by artists taking on another track shortly after called 'Swim' by Cape Cub under the label Disco:Wax - Sony Norde. 'Swim' racked over twenty million plays on Spotify and was offrami's second song to reach No. 1 on Hype Machine. 2016 included another remix by offrami for MaJLo's song 'Another Day' which racked over fifteen million plays on Spotify. After seeing his remixes successes, offrami decided to end the year by releasing an original along with artist Natio, 'Breathing', under the label Armada Music.

2017
After releasing his first original, offrami enjoyed the process of creating his own work. He began the year by signing with Disco:Wax - Sony Norde. During this year offrami released 4 original songs, with each song racking over four million plays on Spotify. offrami ended the year with an officially signed remix by Island Records for Nick Jonas's single 'Find You'.

2018
Offrami started the year with two more official remixes signed by Island Records, Bishop Briggs' Dream and Youngr's LIT. Continuing with his original work, he teamed up with Colton Avery and CASP:R under Disco:Wax - Sony Norde to release 'Fireproof'.  Throughout 2018 offrami pursued a variety of opportunities pushing himself to explore different sounds of his own. His music style evolved from tropical house to a blend of electronic and urban feel good sounds. He ended the year with releasing his first Dancehall pop original song 'Santa Monica' with artist Hoosh under the label Lowly Palace.

2019
2019 marked offrami's most independent and original year thus far. Offrami began 2019 by releasing 7 original songs independently noticing the attraction his music is still receiving without being signed to a label.

Discography

Originals

Remixes

References 

1994 births
Living people
Black Butter Records artists
Lebanese record producers